Mooreland Hill School was an independent Kindergarten to Grade 9 school located in Kensington, Connecticut.

Information
 Sports: Fall: Soccer, Field HockeyWinter: Basketball, HikingSpring: Baseball, Softball, Tennis
 Member: Connecticut Association of Independent Schools (CAIS) , NAIS

History

The Modern Era

Reed Rathgeber became the first female to be the Head of School in 2015.  She is an alumna of Mooreland Hill School (class of 1996) and a graduate of Westminster School, St. Lawrence University (B.A), and Simmons College (M.A.T).  Prior to coming to Mooreland Hill, Ms. Rathgeber was a 7th and 8th grade history and English teacher at The Pierce School in Brookline, MA.

References

External links
 Mooreland Hill School homepage

Private middle schools in Connecticut
Berlin, Connecticut
Schools in Hartford County, Connecticut